Casaleone is a comune (municipality) in the Province of Verona in the Italian region Veneto, located about  southwest of Venice and about  southeast of Verona.

References

External links
 Official website
 ViviCasaleone

Cities and towns in Veneto